The U.S. Army, Air Force, Navy, Marines, and Coast Guard participated in the US invasion of Panama (1989–1990, Operation Just Cause). Forces that participated include:

United States Southern Command
 United States Army South (USARSO)
 XVIII Airborne Corps – Joint Task Force South
1st Corps Support Command (United States) (Fort Bragg)
46th Support Gp.
189th Maintenance Battalion
8th Ordnance Company (ammo) attached to SOUTHCOM to augment the 565 Ordnance Detachment (ammo)
 525th Military Intelligence Brigade (Combat Electronic Warfare and Intelligence) (Airborne)(FT Bragg)
 319th Military Intelligence Battalion (Operations) (Airborne) (FT Bragg)
 A Co. 319th MI BN (Corps Tactical Operations Support Element)
 B Co. 319th MI BN (Signal)
 519th Military Intelligence Battalion (Tactical Exploitation) (Airborne) (FT Bragg)
 A Co 519th MI BN (Interrogation)
 B Co. 519th MI BN (Counterintelligence)
 C Co. 519th MI BN (SIGINT and Voice Intercept)
 16th MP Brigade Fort Bragg
 92nd MP Battalion Fort Clayton
 549th MP Company Fort Davis
 1138th MP Company, Det. 1, Missouri Army National Guard, Doniphan, Missouri
 1109th Signal Brigade
 35th Signal Brigade (25th Signal Battalion/426th Signal Battalion) Fort Bragg North Carolina
 142nd Medical Battalion
 324th Support Group
 470th Military Intelligence Brigade
 747th MI BN, Galeta Island
 29th MI BN, Fort Davis
 193rd Infantry Brigade, Task Forces Bayonet''
 1st Battalion (Airborne), 508th Parachute Infantry Regiment (United States)
 5th Battalion, 87th Infantry
 4th Battalion, 6th Infantry. Detach from 5th Infantry Division (Mechanized)
 C Company, 3rd Battalion, 73rd Armor Regiment (Airborne), Detach from 82nd ABN Div
 D Company, 2nd Light Armored Infantry Battalion (USMC)
 D Battery, 320th Field Artillery Regiment
 59th Engineer Company (Sapper)
 519th Military Police Battalion, Fort Meade, MD
 209th Military Police Company, Fort Meade, MD
 555th Military Police Company, Fort Lee, VA
 988th Military Police Company, Fort Benning Georgia
 401st Military Police Company, Fort Hood
 7th Infantry Division (Light), Task Force Atlantic A Troop, 2nd Squadron, 9th Cavalry
 2nd Brigade
 2nd Battalion, 27th Infantry Regiment (DRF 2)
 5th Battalion, 21st Infantry Regiment
 3rd Battalion, 27th Infantry Regiment (DRF 1)
 6th Battalion, 8th Field Artillery Regiment
 A Battery, 2-62d ADA
 B Company, 27th Engineer Battalion
 B Company, 7th Medical Battalion
 B Company, 707th Maintenance Battalion
 B Company, 7th Supply and Transportation Battalion
 3rd Brigade
 4th Battalion, 17th Infantry Regiment
 3rd Battalion, 17th Infantry Regiment
 C Company, 2d Battalion, 27th Infantry Regiment
 3rd Battalion, 504th Parachute Infantry Regiment, Detach from 82nd ABN Div
 B Battery, 7th Battalion, 15th Field Artillery Regiment
 B Battery, 2d Battalion, 62nd Air Defense Artillery Regiment
 C Company, 27th Engineer Battalion
 C Company, 7th Medical Battalion
 C Company, 707th Maintenance Battalion
 C Company, 7th Supply & Transportation Battalion
 3d Platoon, Company B, 127th Signal Battalion
 127th Signal Battalion (-)
 27th Engineer Battalion (-)
 7th Military Police Company (-)
 107th Military Intelligence Battalion (-)
 5th Public Affairs Detachment
 82nd Airborne Division, Task Force Pacific 1st Brigade
 1st Battalion, 504th Parachute Infantry Regiment
 2d Battalion, 504th Parachute Infantry Regiment
 3d Battalion, 504th Parachute Infantry Regiment
 4th Battalion, 325th Airborne Infantry Regiment (-)
 A Company, 3d Battalion, 505th Parachute Infantry Regiment
 A Battery, 3d Battalion, 319th Airborne Field Artillery Regiment
 A Battery, 3d Battalion, 4th Air Defense Artillery Regiment
 C Company, 3d Battalion, 73d Armored Regiment (-)
 A Company, 307th Engineer Battalion
 A Company, 782d Maintenance Battalion
 B Company, 307th Medical Battalion
 A Company, 407th Supply & Services Battalion
 A Company, 313th Military Intelligence Battalion
1st Brigade, 7th Infantry Division
 1st Battalion, 9th Infantry Regiment
 2d Battalion, 9th Infantry Regiment
 3d Battalion, 9th Infantry Regiment
 A Company, 13th Engineer Battalion
 A Company, 707th Maintenance Battalion
 A Company, 7th Medical Battalion
 A Company, 7th Supply and Transportation Battalion
 1st Platoon, B Company, 127th Signal Battalion
 Company B, 82d Signal Battalion (-)
 82d Military Police Company (-)
 511th Military Police Company, Fort Drum
 Aviation Brigade, 7th Infantry Division, Task Force Aviation 1st Battalion, 228th Aviation Regiment 
 195th Air Traffic Control Platoon
 214th Medical Detachment
 3rd Battalion, 123d Aviation, Task Force Hawk (Fort Ord)
 E Company, 123d Aviation Regiment (-)
 1st Battalion, 82d Aviation Regiment, Task Force Wolf (Fort Bragg)
 1st Battalion, 82d Aviation Regiment (-)
 Troop D, 1st Squadron, 17th Cavalry Regiment
 1st Battalion, 123d Aviation Regiment (-)
 Company D, 82d Aviation Regiment (-)United States Marine Corps 6th Marine Expeditionary Brigade, Task Force Semper Fi (MARFOR)
 I Company, 3rd Battalion, 6th Marine Regiment
 K Company, 3d Battalion, 6th Marines
 Company D, 2nd Light Armored Infantry Battalion (-)
 G and H Detachment, Brigade Service Support Group 6
 1st Platoon, Fleet Antiterrorism Security Teams
 Marine Corps Security Guard Detachment (U.S. Embassy)
 Marine Corps Security Force Company Panama
 534th Military Police Company (U.S. Army), Fort Clayton
 536th Engineer Battalion (U.S. Army)United States Special Operations Command 7th Special Forces Group
 160th Special Operations Aviation Regiment (Airborne)
 SEAL Team 2
 SEAL Team 4
 SEAL Team 6
 1st Special Forces Operational Detachment-DELTA
 75th Ranger Regiment
 96th Civil Affairs Battalion
 4th Psychological Operations Group
 8th Special Operations Squadron
 16th Special Operations Squadron
 20th Special Operations Squadron
 55th Special Operations Squadron
 919th Special Operations WingUnited States Air Force 24th Composite Wing, Howard AFB
 317th Tactical Airlift Wing
 39th Tactical Airlift Squadron
 40th Tactical Airlift Squadron
 41st Tactical Airlift Squadron
 314th Tactical Airlift Wing
 50th Tactical Airlift Squadron
 146th Tactical Airlift Wing, California Air National Guard
 815th Tactical Airlift Squadron
 Twenty-Second Air Force
 60th Military Airlift Wing
 62d Military Airlift Wing
 63d Military Airlift Wing
 437th Military Airlift Wing
 433d Military Airlift Wing
 32d Aeromedical Evacuation Group
 34th Aeromedical Evacuation Squadron
 512th Military Airlift Wing
 172d Military Airlift Wing
 363d Security Police Squadron
 27th Security Police Squadron
 3d Mobile Aerial Port Squadron (3d MAPS)
 366th Tactical Fighter Wing
 37th Tactical Fighter Wing
 836th Security Police Squadron
 63d Security Police Squadron
 552d Airborne Warning And Control Wing
 3d Combat Communications Group
 Aerospace Audiovisual Service (AAVS)
 1352d Combat Camera Squadron, Norton AFB, Calif.
 1361st Combat Camera Squadron, Charleston AFB, South Carolina
 1369th Combat Camera Squadron, Vandenberg AFB, Calif.United States Navy'''
 United States Navy SEALs
 Naval Special Warfare Unit EIGHT
 Special Boat Unit TWENTY-SIX
 United States Naval Small Craft and Technical Training School (NAVSCIATTS)
 
 Mine Division 127

References 

United States invasion of Panama
Operation Just Cause
Operation Just Cause